The Cooper T59 was the third series Formula Junior racing car produced by the Cooper Car Company, designed for the 1962 season. Similar in layout to the T56, the T59 was five inches narrower and one and half inches lower than its predecessor. A semi-reclining seat position was adopted for the driver.  The chassis frame was stiffened up and the front and rear roll centres raised. T59s were supplied with either Ford or BMC 'A series' engines.

Complete Formula One World Championship results
(key)

* Includes points scored by other Cooper models

External links
 Cooper T59, www.formulajunior.com

Cooper racing cars
Formula Junior cars
Tasman Series cars